Velvet Sky may refer to:

Velvet Sky (born Jamie Szantyr), an American professional wrestler
Velvet Sky (airline), a South African airline
Velvet Sky, a song by Los Lonely Boys on Los Lonely Boys

See also 
 Velvet (disambiguation)